Alejandro Damián González Hernández (born 23 March 1988) is a Uruguayan footballer who plays as a right back for Universidad San Martín of the Peruvian Primera División. He has spent most of his career with Peñarol in his native Uruguay, as well as teams in Mexico, Peru, and Italy.

Club career
González started his career in 2005 playing for Peñarol. In 2008, he was champion of the Uruguayan Torneo Clausura playing for Peñarol. He was than loaned out to Tigres B in Mexico, that same year he played for Tacuarembó F.C.

He joined Sporting Cristal in the Primera Division Peruana in January 2009.

On 28 June 2013, he joined Hellas Verona, who had just returned to Serie A, for an undisclosed fee.

On 8 January 2015, he was loaned to struggling fellow Serie A club Cagliari for the remainder of the season, the first signing by new manager Gianfranco Zola.

International career
González played for Uruguay at the South American Under 17 Football Championship and the 2005 FIFA U-17 World Championship.

In 2007, he played in the 2007 South American Youth Championship.

References

1988 births
Living people
Footballers from Montevideo
Association football fullbacks
Uruguayan footballers
Uruguay under-20 international footballers
Uruguay youth international footballers
Uruguayan expatriate footballers
Uruguayan Primera División players
Serie A players
Serie B players
Chilean Primera División players
Peruvian Primera División players
Ecuadorian Serie A players
Sporting Cristal footballers
Peñarol players
Tacuarembó F.C. players
Hellas Verona F.C. players
Cagliari Calcio players
U.S. Avellino 1912 players
Ternana Calcio players
A.C. Perugia Calcio players
Club Deportivo Palestino footballers
Barcelona S.C. footballers
Defensor Sporting players
Expatriate footballers in Chile
Expatriate footballers in Mexico
Expatriate footballers in Peru
Expatriate footballers in Italy
Expatriate footballers in Ecuador
Uruguayan expatriate sportspeople in Chile
Uruguayan expatriate sportspeople in Mexico
Uruguayan expatriate sportspeople in Peru
Uruguayan expatriate sportspeople in Italy
Uruguayan expatriate sportspeople in Ecuador